Skenea trochoides is a species of sea snail, a marine gastropod mollusk in the family Skeneidae.

G.W. Tryon thought this species was a synonym of Cyclostrema peterseni Frielle, 1877 (now a synonym of Skenea peterseni (Friele, 1877))

Description
The size of the shell varies between 2 mm and 3 mm. The white shell is perforate, somewhat solid. It is opaque, smooth, and shining. The base of the shell contains sometimes a few faint oblique, curved lines;. The four whorls are convex and have a deep suture. The columellar lip is vertical, forming a slight angle with the outer lip at their junction.

Distribution
This species occurs in Arctic waters and in the northern Atlantic Ocean off Greenland, the Faroes and Scandinavia at depths between 60 m and 160 m.

References

 Gofas, S.; Le Renard, J.; Bouchet, P. (2001). Mollusca, in: Costello, M.J. et al. (Ed.) (2001). European register of marine species: a check-list of the marine species in Europe and a bibliography of guides to their identification. Collection Patrimoines Naturels, 50: pp. 180–213

External links
 

trochoides
Gastropods described in 1876